Papilio constantinus, the Constantine's swallowtail, is a butterfly of the family Papilionidae. It is found in Sub-Saharan Africa.

The wingspan is 70–90 mm in males and 80–95 mm in females. The ground colour is black with pale yellow or white markings including a large yellow spot in the cell. Its flight period is during the warmer months peaking from November to February.

The larvae feed on Vepris Reflexi, Vepris lanceolata, Vepris undulata, Clausena species, Citrus species, Teclea trifoliatum, Teclea nobilis, and Teclea gerrardii.

Taxonomy
Papilio constantinus is a member of the dardanus species group. The members of the clade are:

Papilio dardanus Brown, 1776
Papilio constantinus Ward, 1871
Papilio delalandei Godart, [1824]
Papilio phorcas Cramer, [1775]
Papilio rex Oberthür, 1886

Subspecies

Listed alphabetically:
Papilio constantinus constantinus Ward, 1871 (south-eastern Ethiopia, southern Somalia, coast of Kenya, Tanzania, Malawi, southern and north-eastern Zambia, Mozambique, Zimbabwe, eastern Botswana, South Africa, Eswatini)
Papilio constantinus lecerfi Koçak, 1996 (Kenya: central highlands and the Mau Escarpment)
Papilio constantinus mweruanus Joicey & Talbot, 1927   (Democratic Republic of the Congo, western Tanzania, Zambia)

Biogeographic realm
Afrotropical realm.

References

Carcasson, R.H. 1960 "The Swallowtail Butterflies of East Africa (Lepidoptera, Papilionidae)". Journal of the East Africa Natural History Society pdf Key to East Africa members of the species group, diagnostic and other notes and figures. (Permission to host granted by The East Africa Natural History Society)

External links

 Butterflycorner Images from Naturhistorisches Museum Wien

Butterflies described in 1871
constantinus
Butterflies of Africa
Taxa named by Christopher Ward (entomologist)